Eurypogon is a genus of soft-bodied plant beetles in the family Artematopodidae. There are about 11 described species in Eurypogon.

Species
These 11 species belong to the genus Eurypogon:
 Eurypogon brevipennis Sakai, 1982
 Eurypogon californicus Horn, 1880
 Eurypogon cribratus (Hampe, 1866)
 Eurypogon granulatus Sakai, 1982
 Eurypogon harrisii (Westwood, 1862)
 Eurypogon heishuiensis Kundrata, Bocakova & Bocak, 2013
 Eurypogon hisamatsui Sakai, 1982
 Eurypogon jaechi Kundrata, Bocakova & Bocak, 2013
 Eurypogon japonicus Sakai, 1982
 Eurypogon niger (Melsheimer, 1846)
 Eurypogon ocularis Sakai, 1982

References

Further reading

External links

 

Elateroidea genera
Articles created by Qbugbot